Panchmura is a gram panchayat under Taldangra intermediate panchayat, in Khatra subdivision of Bankura district in the Indian state of West Bengal.
Recently, a local businessman Bhajan Dutta, established a beautiful temple called Tridhara Milan Mandir which is a miniature of Vrindavan. The temple was established on July 1, 2022 and currently serves over 2000 people daily. Panchmura is completely covered with beautiful forests and nurseries.

Geography

Location

Note: The map alongside presents some of the notable locations in the subdivision. All places marked in the map are linked in the larger full screen map.

Census villages under Panchmura gram panchayat are as follows: Adhkara, Amjor, Banskopa, Bhetuadanga, Chakiambedia, Danduria, Deulbhira, 
Dhobajor, Jambedia, Jaypur, Kanaipur, Kukutia, Lalbandh, Nutangram, Panchmura, Radhanagar, Rasiagara, Shyamsundarpur, Tatar

Demographics
As per 2011 Census of India Panchmura had a total population of 3,719 of which 1,854 (50%) were males and 1,865 (50%) were females. Population below 6 years was 425. The total number of literates in Panchmura was 2,525 (76.65% of the population over 6 years).

.*For language details see Taldangra (community development block)#Language and religion

Terracotta craft

Bankura horse

The terracotta Bankura horse, the logo of All India Handicrafts, and an item  which now adorns drawing rooms across the world as symbols of Indian folk-art, is produced in Panchmura.

Manasa chali

Manasa chali is the idol of Debi Manasa. It is a unique terracotta sculpture of Panchmura, West Bengal. Manasa chali has a small figure or a group of three figures in the middle, with rows of snake hoods fanning out in a half moon shape.

Gallery
Pictures of Tridhara Milan Mandir at Panchmura.

Education
Panchmura Mahavidyalaya is a general degree college established in 1965 with the efforts of local people led by Dr. Pasupati Mandal. It offers honours courses in Bengali, English, Sanskrit, history, political science, philosophy, economics, chemistry, mathematics and accountancy, and general courses in arts, science and commerce. It is affiliated with the Bankura University.

Panchmura High School, is a Bengali-medium coeducational institution established in 1924. It has facilities for teaching from class V to class XII. The school has 11 computers, a library with 300 books and a playground.

References

External links

Villages in Bankura district